The High Sheriff of North Yorkshire is a current High Sheriff title which has existed since 1974. For around 1,000 years the entire area of Yorkshire was covered by a single High Sheriff of Yorkshire. After the Local Government Act 1972 the title was split to cover several newly created counties, including North Yorkshire.

Below is a list of the sheriffs.

List of High Sheriffs

References

External links
HighSheriffs.com
High Sheriff of North Yorkshire

Local government in North Yorkshire
North Yorkshire
North Yorkshire
High Sheriff